Montabaur station is a station at the 89.1 kilometre point of the Cologne-Frankfurt high-speed railway and on the Limburg–Siershahn railway (Lower Westerwald Railway) in the German state of Rhineland-Palatinate. The station, which is served by regional and long-distance passenger services and freight traffic, is on the outskirts of the town of Montabaur. It is aligned parallel with Autobahn 3 (A3), which runs immediately to the north.

The construction costs amounted to €23.6 million.

Station infrastructure

The new line runs through the area of the station on a roughly 15 metre-high embankment. The station's tracks are divided into an area for high-speed line operations (with the German operating points code of FMT) and an area serving regional operations on the Lower Westerwald Railway (operating points abbreviation FMTN). There is only an indirect connection between the two parts: the eastern catch point from the northern Intercity-Express (ICE) platform track (4), has a connection to platform track 5 (the regional platform); this involves a reversal.

Five tracks are available for passenger transport. Next to track 1 and between tracks 4 and 5, there are two 405 m long and 76 cm high platforms, which both have a 200-metre-long section under cover. The platform face on track 5 is divided into platform 5a to the west and 5b to the east, with mid-platform exit tracks that cross, permitting trains to run in both directions. Track 5 is used exclusively by regional trains and tracks 1–4 are only used by ICEs. Tracks 2 and 3 are the main tracks used by non-stopping trains on the high-speed line. In addition, there are seven tracks available for freight.

The tracks are elevated and are crossed by an underpass between the platforms. A two-storey station building was built at the side facing towards the town. The main entrance to the station on the southern side is accessed by a staircase and a lift, while the passage to the northern entrance hall is at ground level. Information and emergency call boxes are installed at both entrances.

The circulatory area houses a Deutsche Bahn travel centre with two ticket offices, toilets, a waiting room and lockers. In other commercial areas there is a snackbar, a drugstore, a barbershop and an ATM of the Sparkasse Westerwald (savings bank). In addition, there is the so-called Schaufenster der Region ("showcase of the region") with presentations of local companies and an information office of the town. A total of 700 m² was created for marketing areas. The station hall and the station forecourt are covered by a Wi-Fi hotspot.

An underpass is connected by two escalators, stairs and a lift to give access to both platforms. There is also a telephone box for information and emergencies as well as seating. The platform for tracks 4 and 5 features a lounge for platform service employees. The station basement also houses a Federal Police station, located behind the main staircase. The station building is closed at night from 0:45 to 4:10.

Montabaur station is one of four stations in Germany, along with Limburg Süd, also located on the Cologne–Frankfurt high-speed railway, and Allersberg (Rothsee) and Kinding (Altmühltal) on the Nuremberg–Munich high-speed railway, which are planned to be passed at 300 km/h.

West of the station, at kilometer 87.1, is the eastern end of the Dernbach tunnel, and to the east of the station is the Himmelberg tunnel .

History

The planning of a Cologne–Gross-Gerau high-speed railway in the 1970s envisaged a station at Montabaur on its right bank (east of the Rhine) route alternative. The four-track infrastructure would have, in addition to the two central through tracks, two external platform tracks connected by scissors crossovers (with four sets of points) at each end of the station. The proposed station was assessed as having "predominantly regional importance", which justified "only a limited number of train stops". 
 
A report commissioned by the state of Rhineland-Palatinate, which took into account only the territory of Rhineland-Palatine, determined in the late 1980s that 400,000 inhabitants and 210,000 employees would live in a car within 30 minutes in 2000.
 
The route of the new line in Rhineland-Palatinate was the subject of many years of debate and political compromise. First, in the mid-1988, then Chancellor Helmut Kohl promised a high-speed link to the federal capital to the then mayor of Bonn, Hans Daniels. The Department of Transport developed, on the basis of this promise, a route running through Vilich in the northeastern outskirts of Bonn. This route would have cost around half a billion Deutschmarks (DM) more than the planned (and later realised) route via Siegburg, but half a billion DM less than running through Bonn Central Station (Hauptbahnhof).
 
Prior to a decision of the Rhine route in the Federal Cabinet, the then-premier of Rhineland-Palatinate, Carl-Ludwig Wagner, called for a so-called option S in an interview in July 1989. This envisaged a right bank route taking a sharp curve from Dernbach through a tunnel and a bridge over the Rhine to Koblenz before taking another sharp curve back over another Rhine crossing to a purely right bank route to Frankfurt. The estimated additional costs of this option were DM 1.3 to 2.8 billion (about €0.7 to 1.4 billion). The Federal Transport Minister, Friedrich Zimmermann, spoke of a "provincial farce" and suggested, as a compromise, the establishment of a high-speed station in Limburg to provide a connection with Koblenz. In addition to the establishment of the station, the compromise proposal provided for a package of other railway infrastructure in Rhineland-Palatinate. The then Deutsche Bundesbahn initially accepted the route via Limburg and Vilich in order to prevent further delays to the project.
 
After the completion of the route selection process, the Federal Cabinet decided on 20 December 1989 that the line would be built on the current route of the high-speed line along the A3. It also agreed to a station at Limburg. A station in Montabaur was not explicitly mentioned.
 
On 21 March 1990, an agreement on the planned new line between the premiers of Rhineland-Palatinate and Hesse and the Federal Minister of Transport called for a site at Montabaur. A major reason for the proposal for this station was that by this time it had been decided that the three options considered for connecting to Limburg were not feasible and therefore there would be no direct connection to the Lahntal railway, which would have provided a connection to both Koblenz and Gießen. The station that was built instead in Montabaur would have good accessibility to both these areas via a new autobahn interchange in Montabaur. 
 
In the planning process, the possibility of an ICE stop was studied from 1991. In the spring of 1993, Heinz Dürr, the Chairman of Deutsche Bundesbahn, and Rainer Brüderle, the Rhineland-Palatinate Minister of Economics and Transport, agreed on the establishment of a station in Montabaur. Construction of the ICE railway station was confirmed at the completion of the planning process in 1995. Construction began in 1997.

In 1993, Deutsche Bundesbahn signed a contract that provided that an ICE would stop in Montabaur every hour until 2007. The destination and origins of these services would be determined later. The state participated in the financing of the station and established the new autobahn interchange. The town of Montabaur also built an industrial park at the station, which was intended to be the nucleus for a new district between the station and the existing settlement. The Montabaur urban management concept envisaged, in the 1990s, the comprehensive development of a 51 hectare area, on which up to 4,000 people would live and work by 2000. The new area was developed in cooperation between the town, the state and the Westerwald district. The plans for the high-speed line in 1995 included stops in Montabaur and Limburg Süd for one of the five planned ICE services.
 
The planned cost in 1997 was DM 27 million (about €14 million). The federal government and the state of Rhineland-Palatinate participated in financing the station and the state also built the new autobahn interchange. Under the planning arrangements of 1998, the Rhineland-Palatinate state government would provide finance of DM 5.75 million and the town would fund DM 750,000.

Montabaur mayor Paul Possel-Dölken expected in 1998 that the station would generate 300 new jobs and 2,000 additional apartments for new residents. In mid-1999, the railway embankment in the area of the station was nearly completed and the concreting of the station underpass was in full swing. 
 
The final cost of the station was about €13.5 million, of which the state ultimately funded over €4.1 million. The rest was financed by the Federal Government and Deutsche Bahn.

In 2000, it was planned that more than DM 100 million would be invested in urban development in the area of the station and in its transport links. Federal highway 255 would be upgraded, the station car park would be connected to the A 3 and an underground garage with 170 parking spaces would be created under the bus station. According to a report of the state government for the same year, the state's commitment for the transport facilities at the station amounted to around DM 20 million. According to other data, the town of Montabaur wanted to invest, with the support of the state, DM 56 million in the station environment. 
 
The ceremonial start of the construction of an underground car park with 127 parking spaces at the station was celebrated in mid-2000.

Opening

On 9 September 2001, around 20,000 people took the opportunity to participate in a community walk. The four available routes began at the station and covered distances ranging from 4.8 to 18 km. 
 
The station replaces the existing Montabaur station, which was served by its last passenger train on 6 July 2000. Within four days, the sidings were relocated. This also enabled the construction of the new line in areas that had previously been occupied by the railway tracks to the old Montabaur station. The first regional train arrived on 10 July 2000 at 5:41 AM at the new Montabaur station on its way from Siershahn to Staffel. The railway infrastructure of the high-speed line was still under construction at this time.
 
The first ICE stopped on 25 July 2002 from 12:09 to 12:21, on its way from Frankfurt to Cologne with Hartmut Mehdorn and Doris Schröder-Köpf on board. In Montabaur, the Rhineland-Palatinate Minister of Transport, Hans-Artur Bauckhage, joined the guests and continued on the special train to Cologne. The next day, a train taking a similar journey and carrying 2,000 people involved in the project stopped at the new station. DB Netz board member Klaus Junker took symbolic possession of the line in a ceremony.
 
Operations of the first regular trains started on the new line on 1 August 2002. Montabaur was one of three intermediate stations between Cologne and Frankfurt Airport that was served by every third train. 20 ICE trains stopped in Montabaur on weekdays in early 2003 and 21 stopped there from 15 June 2003.

A parking area with 350 parking spaces had been opened. Moreover, there was an option to expand it to 600 spaces.

In service
The number of daily ICE stops in Montabaur was increased in June 2003. The change to the 2003/2004 timetable on 14 December 2003 introduced a further four ICE stops on Mondays and Fridays, three on services towards Cologne.
 
1.4 percent of commuters on the high-speed services connected by public transport at the station. The additional regional bus services to Koblenz and the Rhine Valley established at the opening of high-speed services were closed in 2004 due to lack of demand.
 
At the beginning of 2003, about 1,100 passengers used the station every day; in early 2004 this had risen to almost 2,000. A passenger count in June 2005 found about 2,150 ICE passengers used the station each day. In the summer of 2007 nearly 3,000 ICE passengers used the station each day. In 2008, the daily number of passengers was about 2,400. The number of boardings and alightings at the station increased by 3.5 percent between 2011 and 2012. There was a total of about 10,000 people who commuted daily from the Montabaur area to Frankfurt am Main by all modes in 2002.

The two millionth passenger was welcomed to the station on 22 June 2006.
 
A survey of 500 passengers in the summer of 2007 found that business passengers and commuters made up about three quarters of all passengers. The majority of respondents complained that there were insufficient parking spaces at the station.
 
In May 2009, a parking garage was opened with 400 spaces at the station, to serve in particular the employees of the surrounding business park. The total investment amounted to €3.3 million. In August 2010, construction work began on another car park with 300 parking spaces to be completed in late 2011. 
 
Two class 226 locomotives were stationed in Montabaur to tow broken-down ICE sets in 2003. However, these were scrapped in 2004 and replaced by class 218.8 locomotives by 2005.

Effect on urban development 
According to information provided by the town of Montabaur, the state had invested DM 16 million in the area around the station by 2000. A further DM 40 million were then planned to be invested.
 
More than 30 companies, with more than 600 jobs, had been established in the adjacent ICE-Park business park by August 2006. Ralph Dommermuth, CEO of United Internet, which has its headquarters in Montabaur, promotes, as an investor, the development of the commercial zone, which also includes the building of a controversial factory outlet centre.

A 2010 study by the University of Hamburg and the London School of Economics and Political Science determined that in the period from 2002 to 2006, there had been additional economic growth of 2.7 percent in the catchment area of the new stations of Limburg and Montabaur. This growth is clearly a result of improved market access due to the stations.

Operations
The 2007 timetable (commencing on 10 December 2006) included around 80 trains stopping in Montabaur on each working day:
15 trains operate on weekdays from platform 1 towards Frankfurt (Frankfurt Airport and Frankfurt Central Station). The travel time over the approximately 80 to 90 km of line is about 30 to 40 minutes.
 Two daily trains also run to Wiesbaden (77 km) from platform 1 in 30 minutes.
22 trains run from platform 4 towards Cologne. Most ICEs require about 30 to 40 minutes to cover the approximately 90 km of track.
Trains are operated by DreiLänderBahn from platform 5a  to Limburg (Lahn) station in about 45 minutes.  Twelve pairs of trains operate each way on weekdays and six pairs operate on Saturdays, Sundays and public holidays.
The DreiLänderBahn trains take about 17 minutes to run in the opposite direction to Siershahn from platform 5b.

The ICE services (38 trains on weekdays) take nine minutes to cover the 21.4 rail km to Limburg Süd station. Critics call this connection, which is authorised to operate at speeds of up to 300 km/h, the "fastest S-Bahn in the world".

The station is conveniently located near the Montabaur junction (No. 40) of autobahn 3. 350 park-and-ride parking spaces were available at its opening. This number had grown to 900 by August 2006 and another 130 paid parking spaces are under the bus station.

Three taxi stands have been established at the station. 15 bus routes operate from the adjacent bus station, including a free passenger shuttle bus for the ICE services, which runs to about two km south of the district town centre.

Long-distance and regional transport

Rail infrastructure
The tracks run on an embankment at a height of 14 metres in an east-west direction, parallel to the A 3, which runs immediately to the north. The through tracks, 2 and 3, run on slab track with UIC-60 (60 kg/m) rails. The three platform tracks and the freight tracks, however, run on ballast. All four long-distance tracks (1–4) are equipped with the Linienzugbeeinflussung automatic train protection system.

East and west of the station are sets of points leading to the platform tracks. Operations over the points toward the platform tracks can be run at 100 km/h. The main through tracks are protected by catch points against side-on collisions from trains running from the platform tracks.

Near the station is one of five electric sub-stations on the high-speed line as well as a sub-centre of the electronic interlocking system, which is controlled by the electronic control centre in Frankfurt am Main. The sub-centre controls the high-speed line from the Idstein crossover to the approach to Siegburg/Bonn station and monitors and controls the Limburg-Staffel–Siershahn railway in the vicinity of Montabaur station. Transfer of control of the whole Limburg-Staffel–Siershahn line to the interlocking is planned.

Criticism
The stations of Limburg Süd and Montabaur, which are approximately 20 km apart, have been criticised in the past as being the result of political blackmail. After Limburg Süd station had already been agreed in the late 1980s, Rhineland-Palatinate had demanded a station in Montabaur before it would allow a smooth approval process for the new line.

Notes

References
  (thesis)

External links 
 

Railway stations in Rhineland-Palatinate
Railway stations in Germany opened in 2000
Buildings and structures in Westerwaldkreis